The Fourth Legislature of Quebec was the provincial legislature of Quebec, Canada that existed from 1878 to 1881, following the general election of 1878.

The 1878 election was called by Premier Henri-Gustave Joly de Lotbinière, leader of the Quebec Liberal Party, after he had been installed in office by the Lieutenant Governor Luc Letellier de St-Just. The Lieutenant Governor had dismissed the former Conservative Premier, Charles Boucher de Boucherville, over a dispute about railway legislation proposed by the  Boucher de Boucherville government.

Since the Liberals did not have a majority in the Legislative Assembly, Joly de Lotbinière called an election immediately. The election resulted in a hung parliament, with neither party having a majority in the Legislative Assembly.  Joly de Lotbinière was able to stay in office for one year with a minority government, supported by two Independent Conservatives, but lost a confidence vote in 1879. The Quebec Conservative Party led by Joseph-Adolphe Chapleau then formed a majority government for the remainder of the term of the Legislature.

The Legislature held four annual sessions, with the first session called on June 4, 1878. The Legislature was dissolved on November 7, 1881, leading to the 1881 general election on December 2, 1881.

Structure of the Legislature 

The Legislature of Quebec was created by the British North America Act, 1867.  It consisted of the Lieutenant Governor of Quebec, the Legislative Assembly and the Legislative Council.  The Lieutenant Governor was appointed by the Governor General of Canada for a term of five years.  The Legislative Assembly consisted of sixty-five members, elected in single-member constituencies by first-past-the-post elections.  The Legislative Assembly was to last for four years, subject to being dissolved earlier by the Lieutenant Governor.  The Legislative Council consisted of twenty-four members, appointed for life by the Government of Quebec.

Elections and qualifications

Right to vote 

The right to vote in elections to the Legislative Assembly was not universal.  Only male British subjects (by birth or naturalisation), aged 21 or older, were eligible to vote, and only if they met a property qualification.  For residents of larger cities, the qualification was being the owner or occupant of real property assessed at three hundred dollars or more, or for tenants, an annual rent of thirty dollars or more.  For any other municipality, the qualification was being an owner or occupant of real property assessed at two hundred dollars or more, or twenty dollars in annual value. For tenants in smaller centers, the qualification was paying an annual rent of twenty dollars or more.

Women were completely barred from voting.

Judges and many municipal and provincial officials were also barred from voting, particularly officials with law enforcement duties, or duties relating to public revenue. The Returning Officer in each riding was also barred from voting, except when needed to give a casting vote in the event of a tie vote.

Qualification for the Legislative Assembly 

Candidates for election to the Legislative Assembly had to meet stricter qualifications than voters.  In addition to being male, twenty-one or older, and a subject of Her Majesty (by birth or naturalisation), a candidate had to be free from all legal incapacity, and be the proprietor in possession of lands or tenements worth at least $2,000, over and above all encumbrances and charges on the property.

Women were completely barred from membership in the Assembly.

Qualification for the Legislative Council 

The qualifications for the members of the Legislative Council were the same as for the members of the Senate of Canada. Those requirements were:
 Be of the full age of thirty years;
 Be a British subject, either natural-born or naturalised;
 Possess real property in Quebec worth at least $4,000, over and above any debts or incumbrances on the property;
 Have a net worth of at least $4,000, over and above debts and liabilities;
 Reside in Quebec;
 Reside in, or possess his qualifying real property, in the division he was named to represent.

The provisions of the British North America Act, 1867 did not explicitly bar women from being called to the Senate of Canada.  However, until the Persons Case, it was assumed that women could not be called to the Senate, and were thus also barred from the Legislative Council.  In any event, no woman was ever appointed to the Legislative Council.

Events of the Fourth Legislature 

The initial lack of a clear majority in the Legislative Assembly for either party led to political instability for the first eighteen months of the term of the Fourth Legislature.  The Liberal government of Premier Joly de Lotbinière depended on the support of the two Independent Conservatives.  The Liberals agreed to elect one of the two independents, Arthur Turcotte, as Speaker of the Assembly, a highly coveted position.  Given the narrow majority and factiousness within the Liberal caucus itself, Joly de Lotbinière's government was uncertain of support from vote to vote in the Assembly, which affected his ability to implement major legislation. Several times, his government only stayed in office by a vote from Turcotte as Speaker. Joly de Lotbinière's government was also supported from time to time by William Evan Price, who was nominally a Conservative but often voted in support of the government.

On the Conservative side, the former house leader of the party in the Legislative Assembly, Auguste-Réal Angers, lost his seat in the general election. This event badly weakened the authority of the leader of the party, former premier Boucher de Boucherville, who sat in the unelected Legislative Council.  He was forced to cede the leadership of the party to Joseph-Adolphe Chapleau, who became the Leader of the Opposition.

The next event was the dismissal of Lieutenant Governor Luc Letellier de Saint-Just by the new federal Conservative government of Sir John A. Macdonald. Conservatives in Quebec, led by Chapleau, had been pressuring Macdonald to dismiss Letellier de Saint-Just as soon as the Macdonald government had defeated Alexander Mackenzie's Liberal government in the 1878 federal election. Macdonald replaced Letellier de Saint-Just with an equally partisan Conservative, Théodore Robitaille.

By the fall of 1879, Joly de Lotbinère's government was badly weakened. A proposal to abolish the Legislative Council as an austerity measure resulted in a revolt in the Legislative Council.  Urged by Chapleau, the Council refused to pass the provincial budget.  Chapleau attracted the support of five Liberal members of the Legislative Assembly, who crossed the floor and joined the Conservatives, giving Chapleau a majority in the Assembly.  On October 29, 1879, the Assembly passed a motion calling for a coalition government, essentially a motion of non-confidence, by a vote of 35 to 29.  Joly de Lotbinière was confident that he could win an election on the issues.  He advised the new Lieutenant Governor, Robitaille, to dissolve the Assembly and call a general election. On October 30, 1879, Robitaille refused the dissolution.  Joly de Lotbinière resigned and the Lieutenant Governor called on Chapleau to form a government.  The Chapleau government was sworn in on October 31, 1878.  Since he now had a working majority, Chapleau did not call an election, instead leading the Conservative government for the remaining term of the Legislature.  Like the Conservatives the previous year, the Liberals accused the Lieutenant Governor of performing a coup d'état.

Legislative Assembly

Party standings 

The 1878 election returned a hung parliament.  Neither party initially had a majority in the Legislative Assembly.  The Conservatives had one seat more than the Liberals, but there were also two independent Conservatives.  With their support, Premier Joly de Lotbinière was initially able to stay in office.

Members of the Legislative Assembly 

The following candidates were elected to the Legislative Assembly in the 1878 election. The Premiers of Quebec are indicated by Bold italics.  The Speaker of the Legislative Assembly is indicated by small caps. Cabinet Ministers are indicated by Italics.

Reasons for Vacancies

By-elections 

There were fourteen by-elections during the term of the Fourth Legislature. Premier of Quebec is indicated by bold italics. Cabinet ministers are indicated by italics.

Legislative Council

Party standings

The Conservatives had a strong majority in the Legislative Council throughout the Fourth Legislature.

Members during the Fourth Legislature

The Speakers of the Legislative Council are indicated by small caps. Cabinet members are indicated by italics.

Vacancies of less than one month are not shown.
† Died in office.

Executive Council during the Fourth Legislature

There were two different ministries during the term of the Fourth Legislature, under Premiers Joly de Lotbinière (1878-1879) and Chapleau (1879-1881).

Fourth Quebec Ministry:  Joly de Lotbinière Cabinet (1878 - 1879)

Following the election of 1878, Joly de Lotbinière retained much of his Cabinet in the new Legislature, but carried out a Cabinet shuffle the next year, in 1879.  In 1879, Joly de Lotbinière appointed Honoré Mercier to cabinet, even though Mercier did not initially have a seat in the Legislative Assembly.  The resignation of Alexandre Chauveau on September 12, 1879 marked the beginning of the dissolution of the Joly de Lotbinière government. Chauveau would join the Conservatives a month later, along with four other Liberals who crossed the floor and voted to defeat the government on October 29, 1879.  When the Lieutenant Governor refused a dissolution, the government resigned on October 30, 1879.  The Chapleau government was sworn in the next day.

Fifth Quebec Ministry:  Chapleau Cabinet (1879-1882) 

Following the defeat of the Joly de Lotbinière government on a confidence vote on October 29, 1879, the Chapleau government was sworn in on October 31, 1879.

Leaders of the Opposition 

There were two leaders of the Opposition during the Fourth Legislature. Joseph-Adolphe Chapleau was leader for the first eighteen months of the Legislature, from May 1878 to October 1879.  When Premier Joly de Lotbinière resigned and was replaced by Chapelau, Joly de Lotbinière became leader of the Opposition for the remainder of the term of the Legislature, to 1882.

Legislative sessions 

The Legislature had four annual sessions:

 First session: June 4, 1878 to July 20, 1878, with thirty-six sitting days.
 Second session: June 19, 1879 to October 31, 1879, with fifty-seven sitting days.
 Third session: May 28, 1880 to July 24, 1880 with thirty-nine sitting days.
 Fourth session: April 28, 1881 to June 30, 1881, with forty-five sitting days.

The Legislature was dissolved on November 7, 1881.

References

External links
 List of Historical Cabinet Ministers

004